Axinella badungensis is a species of sponge in the family, Axinellidae, which was first described by Belinda Alvarez, Nicole de Voogd & Rob van Soest in 2016, found in the coastal waters of Badung Strait, Indonesia, (from which it takes its epithet, badungensis).

References

Axinellidae
Animals described in 2016

Taxa named by Rob van Soest